Ferenc Esterházy may refer to:

Ferenc Esterházy (1533–1604), ancestor of the House of Esterházy
Ferenc Esterházy (1683–1754), founder of the Cseklész branch, Master of the Treasury (1746–1754)
Ferenc Esterházy (1715–1785), Chancellor of Hungary (1762–1785), Ban of Croatia (1783–1785)